Boris Becker was the defending champion, but chose not to participate that year.

Anders Järryd won the final of the singles event of the ABN AMRO World Tennis Tournament, defeating Karel Nováček  6–3, 7–5.

Seeds

  Boris Becker (withdrew)
  Goran Ivanišević (quarterfinals)
  Ivan Lendl (withdrew)
  Richard Krajicek (first round)
  Alexander Volkov (semifinals)
  Henrik Holm (second round)
  Karel Nováček (final)
  Wayne Ferreira (first round)

Draw

Finals

Top half

Bottom half

References

External links
 Draw

Singles